Elisabeth Rodergas Cols, better known as Beth, (born 23 December 1981 ) is a Spanish singer and actress.

Biography
Beth was born in Súria. After finishing school, she studied musical theatre in Barcelona and lived for a time in the United Kingdom, as well as participated in humanitarian missions in Africa.

In 2002, she entered the musical talent show Operación Triunfo. She finished third, but in a separate vote was selected by the audience to compete in the Eurovision Song Contest 2003. She finished eighth at Eurovision with the song "Dime" (Tell Me), which was a number one hit in Spain; that edition of the contest was the most watched TV program in Spain in 2003. She was referred by British commentator Terry Wogan as Kylie Minogue in dreadlocks, which was played on by many British tabloids.

Beth released her first studio album entitled Otra realidad, which included "Dime", on 23 April 2003 with Vale Music. It peaked at number one on the weekly Spanish Albums Chart and sold 200,000 copies; it ranked tenth in the year-end albums chart.

In 2004, Beth released live album and DVD Palau de la Música Catalana, from her first concert tour Gira Otra realidad 03-04.

On 9 October 2006, Beth released her second studio album, My Own Way Home, this time with Warner Music. Most of the album was composed in London.

On 18 May 2010, Beth released her first Catalan language album, Segueix-me el fil. At the same time, she developed a career as a theatre actress, and in 2013 she starred in the stage musical La Dona vinguda del futur, produced by the Teatre Nacional de Catalunya and created by Marc Rosich and Guille Milkyway.

Beth's fourth studio album, Família was released in 2013.

Discography

References

External links
Official Site 

1981 births
Living people
English-language singers from Spain
Catalan-language singers
Eurovision Song Contest entrants for Spain
Eurovision Song Contest entrants of 2003
Singers from Catalonia
Operación Triunfo contestants
21st-century Spanish singers
21st-century Spanish women singers
Música Global artists